This article lists the diplomatic missions in Vanuatu. At present, the capital Port Vila hosts six embassies. Several other countries are accredited through their embassies in Canberra or elsewhere.

Embassies/High Commissions in Port Vila

Other Posts in Port Vila 
  (Regionalised Delegation)

Non-Resident Embassies/High Commissions 
Resident in Canberra, unless otherwise noted.

 
 
 
 
  (Washington, D.C.)
 
 
 
 
 
  (Bangkok)
  (Pretoria)
  (Tokyo)
 
  (Beijing)
 
  
 
 
  (Kuala Lumpur)
  (Tokyo)
  
  (Port Moresby)
 
  (Tokyo)
  
 
  (Tokyo)
  (Beijing)
 
  (Port Moresby)
 
  (New York City)
  (Jerusalem)
 
 
  
 
  (Tokyo)
 
 
 
  
  (Tokyo)
  (Kuala Lumpur)
  (Tokyo)
  (Port Moresby)
  (Valletta)
 
  
  (Jakarta)
  
  
 
  (Tokyo)
 
 
 
 
 
 
 
 
  (Dili)
 
  (Seoul)
  (Suva)
 
 
  (Port Moresby)
 
  
  (Stockholm)
 
  (Tokyo)
 
 
 
  (Port Moresby)
  (Tokyo)
  (Tokyo)
 
  (Tokyo)
  (Suva)
 
 
  (Port Moresby)
 
 
 
 
 
 
  
  (Tokyo) 
  (Tokyo)

References

Vanuatu
Foreign relations of Vanuatu
Diplomatic missions

Diplomatic missions